Shirakisotima is a genus of the Ducetiini, a tribe of Asian bush crickets (subfamily Phaneropterinae).

There is one recognized species, Shirakisotima japonica.

References

External links

Phaneropterinae
Tettigoniidae genera
Orthoptera of Indo-China
Monotypic Orthoptera genera